The 2014 BRD Năstase Țiriac Trophy - Singles was a session of the larger BRD Năstase Țiriac Trophy tennis tournament held at Arenele BNR in Bucharest, Romania, from 21 to 27 April 2014. Lukáš Rosol was the defending champion, but lost in the final to Grigor Dimitrov 7–6(7–2), 6–1

Seeds 

 Grigor Dimitrov (champion)
 Mikhail Youzhny (second round)
 Gaël Monfils (semifinals, retired)
 Gilles Simon (quarterfinals)

 Vasek Pospisil (first round)
 Andreas Seppi (first round)
 Nicolas Mahut (first round)
 Jarkko Nieminen (second round)

Draw

Finals

Top half

Bottom half

Qualifying

Seeds

 Tobias Kamke (second round)
 Pere Riba (second round)
 Paul-Henri Mathieu (qualified)
 Adrian Ungur (qualified)
 Damir Džumhur (first round)
 Ričardas Berankis (qualified)
 Radu Albot (qualifying competition)
 Jaroslav Pospíšil (qualifying competition)

Qualifiers

  Nikoloz Basilashvili
  Ričardas Berankis
  Paul-Henri Mathieu
  Adrian Ungur

Qualifying draw

First qualifier

Second qualifier

Third qualifier

Fourth qualifier

References

 

BRD Nastase Tiriac Trophyandnbsp;- Singles
2014 Singles